Adrian-Ionuț Chesnoiu (born May 12, 1982, Coteana, Olt, Romania) is a Romanian former deputy, elected in 2020 from Social Democratic Party (PSD). Starting November 25 2021, he became the Minister of Agriculture and Rural Development in the government of Nicolae Ciucă. However, he resigned from this office, as well as from his PSD and Parliament positions on 23 June 2022 after the National Anticorruption Directorate accused him of abuse of office and requested that his judicial immunity be lifted so that it can prosecute him.

References 

1982 births
Living people
Social Democratic Party (Romania) politicians
Romanian Ministers of Agriculture